Hans Gustaf Westman (9 March 1905 – 17 November 1991) was a Swedish architect

Biography
Westman was born in the parish of  Hökhuvud in  Stockholm County, Sweden. He was sent to board at Herlufsholm School in Næstved, Denmark. After graduating from Uppsala University in 1924, Westman graduated from the KTH Royal Institute of Technology in 1929. He made a study trip to Italy in 1929 and with a scholarship from KTH traveled to Italy and Germany in 1935.

He had his own architectural firm in Malmö in 1936–38 and then in Lund. In Westmans villa, built in 1939–1940, Westman combines the modernism of the time with his own, novel thoughts. In addition to housing for his family, it was also furnished to the architect's own office.

His works united regional cultural tradition with functionalism, attempting to create a new, Westmannian regional architecture instead of recreating old models. At the same time, Westman resented functionalists' neglect of the human factor that manifested itself in large-scale buildings with routinely applied monotonous patterns. His critique became a driving force for a humanistic development in architecture of Lund.

Buildings 
Stockholm:
 Expansion of Saint Eric's Cathedral, Stockholm (1983)

Malmö:
 Bylgiahuset
 Mellanhedsskolan

Linköping:
 Sporthallen (1956)
 Simhallen (1965)

Lund:
 Tingshuset
 Polishuset
 Linnéstaden (1945-1948)
 Tomegapsgatan 13 och 15 (1951)
 Kalmar nation (1952)
 Gothenburg nation "Kållehus" (1951)
 Studentlyckan (1958)
 Parentheses (1962)
 Ulrikedal (1963)
 Delphi (1964-1967)
 Fyrklöverhuset (Delphi, Kämnärsvägen, Gylleholmsvägen)
 Lunds Badhus (1938, rivet 1978)
 Idrottshallen I Lund (1941)
 Villa Westman (1939)

References 

1991 deaths
1905 births
People educated at Herlufsholm School
20th-century Swedish architects
People from Stockholm
Westman family
Uppsala University alumni
KTH Royal Institute of Technology alumni